Pur is a German pop band from Bietigheim-Bissingen.

History
The group was initially founded in 1975 under the name Crusade by Roland Bless and Ingo Reidl. Their first releases came out under the name Opus, but after an Austrian band with the same name had a huge hit single in Germany in 1985, they switched to the name Pur. Pur's first hit single in Germany was "Lena", released in 1990. In the 1990s and 2000s they had a string of number 1 albums in Germany. The producer of Pur was Dieter Falk from 1990 to 1998.

Their song "Abenteuerland" is featured in commercials for ThyssenKrupp.

Discography

Further reading
Larmann, Ralph, Pur: Unsere Geschichte in Fotografien & Texten. te Neues Buchverlag, Kempen 2001, . (in German)
Larmann, Ralph: Pur - Das ist passiert! Der Bildband zur Tournee 2003. Schwarzkopf & Schwarzkopf, Berlin 2003, . (in German)

References

External links

Official website 

German musical groups
World Music Awards winners